Muqlus or Mqlos (also spelled Mqlos, Mukloss, Muklous or Muklis) is a village in western Syria, close to the Lebanese border and administratively belonging to the governorate of Homs. 

It is situated in the Wadi al-Nasara ("Valley of Christians") north of Lebanon. Its small population comes originally from Lebanon's northern Christian villages. Their migration to the nearby valley in Syria began in the mid-19th century as a result of the Mount Lebanon civil war.

Nearby localities include Hasour to the north, al-Nasirah to the southwest, Mazinah to the south, Shin to the southeast, Rabah to the east and Fahel to the northeast. It is located about 40 kilometers west of Homs. 

According to the Syria Central Bureau of Statistics (CBS), Muklous had a population of 375 in the 2004 census. The village has a Greek Orthodox Church.

Etymology
The name Muklous is translated as "eye of the lion".

Demographics 
Muklous had a population of 375 in 2004. Its inhabitants are predominantly Greek Orthodox Christians and Alawites.  Expatriates from the village have settled in the Americas and Europe as well as in Lebanon and the Persian Gulf region.

Economy 
Muklous' industry is mainly agriculture, including apples, olives, figs, grapes, plums, peaches and pomegranates.  The village also hosts a factory producing "select vinegar" from the ground fall apples that cannot be otherwise used.

References

Bibliography

 

Populated places in Talkalakh District
Eastern Orthodox Christian communities in Syria
Christian communities in Syria